King Creek Cone is a subglacial mound of the Iskut-Unuk River Cones group in northwestern British Columbia, Canada. It last erupted during the Pleistocene epoch.

See also
List of volcanoes in Canada
List of Northern Cordilleran volcanoes
Volcanology of Canada
Volcanology of Western Canada

References

Volcanoes of British Columbia
Mountains of British Columbia
Northern Cordilleran Volcanic Province
Pleistocene volcanoes
Subglacial mounds of Canada
Boundary Ranges